William Maxwell Hetherington (4 June 1803 – 23 May 1865) was a Scottish minister, poet and church historian. He entered the university of Edinburgh but before completing his studies for the church he published, in 1829, 'Twelve Dramatic Sketches' founded on the Pastoral Poetry of Scotland. Hetherington became minister of Torphichen, Linlithgow, in 1836; in 1843 he adhered to the Free Church, and in 1844 was appointed to a charge in St. Andrews. He subsequently became minister of Free St. Paul's, Edinburgh, in 1848; and was appointed professor of apologetics and systematic theology in New College, Glasgow, in 1857. He died 23 May 1865.

Early life and education
William Hetherington was born on 4 June 1803, in the parish of Troqueer, which, though adjoining the town of Dumfries, is situated in the Stewartry of Kirkcudbright. His father was a gardener, and for the long period of forty years in the employment of Mr. Maxwell of Carruchan. After a basic parish school education, he  left  without  introduction  to  the  study  of  the  Classical Languages. His  relations  to  Professor  Wilson  developed  rapidly  into  intimate  friendship ;  and  it  was  under  his  encouragement,  that  he  ventured  to  publish  in  1829,  before  completing  his  Theological  Curriculum,  a  small  volume  of  poems,  under  the  title  of  "Dramatic Sketches."

Early working life
On  the  completion  of  his  course  of  study,  Mr  Hetherington  received  an  appointment  as  tutor,  first  in  the  family  of  a  Scottish  nobleman,  and  then  to  the  son  of  an  Irish  peer  resident  in  London. This was the work that received the favourable notice of the eminent poet-laureate of the day. Dr. Southey, in his well-known work, "The Doctor," and that indicated, at this early period, the tendency of the author's mind towards historical research, and the generalisations of Christian philosophy.

Church of Scotland ministry
In  1836,  Mr  Hetherington  accepted  a  presentation  to  the  parish  of Torphichen,  in  the  Presbytery  of  Linlithgow.

Perhaps  the  most  effective  of  his  platform  appearances  on  the  Church  question  was  made  at  this  time,  in  Linlithgow,  when,  in  response  to  a  sudden  call  to  take  the  place  of  a  deputation  from  Edinburgh  who  had  failed  to  appear,  he  delivered  an  extempore  address  of  three  hours,  expounding  what  he  saw as  the  principles  at  stake.

Literary productions from Torphichen
His  ministry  at  Torphichen  was  a  period  of  great  literary  activity ; his   "Minister's    Family,"   the   article   "Rome"  for  the  "Encyclopaedia  Britannica,"  and   numerous  contributions  to  the  Presbyterian  Review,  and  other  Magazines,  being  amongst  his lighter  efforts.

Amid the endless references of the day to the history of the Church, and to the public documents which bore upon her constitution, the lack of a "handy book," or manual of the history of the Scottish Church, that should present a bird's-eye view of all the salient points of her career, 
was deeply and widely felt. Mr. Hetherington undertook to supply this want, and set to work with such intense activity, that, within a year, we believe, of his beginning to compose it, a massive octavo volume of 800 pages was given to the public in 1841. Written with such rapidity, and in the whirl of a conflict that caused such intense excitement, the "History of the Church of Scotland" could not but in some respects seem more like the pleading of an advocate than the deliberate and unbiassed conclusions of a judge ; but such was its popularity, that six or seven editions passed very rapidly through the press, including a cheap edition for the people, and a library edition in two volumes.

At the Disruption
The bicentenary of the Westminster Divines fell on the year of the Disruption. The Westminster Assembly's products such as the Confession of Faith were relatively well known in 1843 but comparatively few were familiar with the history of the Assembly. Mr. Hetherington, on the very month of the Disruption, brought out a volume entitled, "History of the Westminster Assembly of Divines."

On  the  28  of  May  Mr  Hetherington  preached  for  the  last  time  in  the  Parish  Church  of  Torphichen. On  the  24  of  the  same  month  Mr  Hetherington  entered  the  new  manse  ;  and,  on  2  October,  a  new  building  was  opened  as  a  school-house. Thus  it  was  given  to  the  congregation  of  Torphichen  to  complete  successively  the  first  church,  manse,  and  school-house  in  connection  with  the  Free Church of Scotland.

Mr  Hetherington  was  sent  in  November 1843,  along  with Robert Smith Candlish,  Andrew Gray of Perth,  D. M. Makgill Crichton, and  others,  to  visit  certain  of  the  leading  towns  in  Yorkshire.

Free Church ministry in St Andrews
His services in the literary field presently recommended him to the notice of the Free Church congregation of St. Andrews, where it was felt to be eminently desirable that a minister should be settled, not only suited to a university town, but capable also of taking some charge of any Free Church students there who might be pursuing their studies with a view to the ministry. At St. Andrews, Mr. Hetherington added to his other duties that of editor of the Free Church Magazine, which he continued to superintend for four years, and in which he wrote many reviews and articles, not only during the time of his own editorship, but also in subsequent years. Immediately  on  his  settlement  in  St  Andrews,  Mr  Hetherington 
received  the  Degree  of  LL.D.  from  the  College  of  New  Brunswick,  U.S. ; and,  eleven  years  later,  in  1855,  the  Degree  of  D.D.  was  conferred  on  him  by  the  Jefferson  College,  Pennsylvania.

Free Church ministry in Edinburgh
On the removal of the Rev. Robert Elder to Rothesay, Dr. Hetherington was called to the charge of Free St. Paul's, in Edinburgh. One of the works of this time was the oversight of two large schools erected through his exertions. In Edinburgh he lived at 27 Minto Street. Among the labours of love in which he engaged during his Edinburgh ministry must be reckoned a course of lectures to young men on the Popish controversy, which he delivered in connection with the Protestant Institute — then commencing its operations in the city. At  this  period  he  was  a  frequent  lecturer  on  subjects  of  general interest— social,  literary,  and  historical;  in  1853,  delivered  in  Exeter  Hall, London,  a  lecture  on  "Coleridge  and  his  Followers;  and  during his  Edinburgh  ministry  wrote  "Memoir of Mrs Coutts."

Work at the Free Church College in Glasgow
After  a  laborious  ministry  of  nine  years  in  Edinburgh,  he  received  a  unanimous  appointment  by  the  General  Assembly  of  1857  to  the  chair  of  Apologetics  and  Systematic  Theology  in  the  Free Church College, Glasgow.

At his time of life, the effort proved too much. It is probable that his constitution was then so far weakened as not to be able to rally from an accident which he received soon after, or to throw off the effects of a stroke of paralysis, which, about the year 1862, disabled him for any active exertion. Nevertheless he continued to write until death. The Assembly having resolved to appoint a colleague and successor to him, the memorable contest ensued which terminated in the appointment of Dr. Islay Burns. He then lived at 13 Oakfield Terrace in Glasgow.

Death and legacy
He died on the 23d May, 1865. Dr. Hetherington was of a frank, manly, outspoken nature, more concerned to speak as he felt, than to avoid all the consequences of his outspokenness. He was particularly fond of students, and his pleasant method of pouring out to them the stores of information which lay in his mind made them as fond of him as he was of them. As a speaker, and as a preacher, he was clear, forcible, and emphatic, although not attaining the first rank in either capacity.  He died at home in Glasgow but is buried with his wife Jessie Meek, who had died in Edinburgh in 1851. The grave lies on the north edge of the north-west section of Grange Cemetery in Edinburgh, under a huge granite Celtic cross by the sculptor John Rhind.

Family
He married 1 June 1836, Jessie (died 2 September 1871), daughter of William Meek, D.D., Hamilton, and had issue — 
William Meek Maxwell, born 11 July 1843
Thomas Chalmers, born 15 September 1847.

Works
Twelve Dramatic Sketches founded on the Pastoral Poetry of Scotland (Edinburgh, 1829)
The Fulness of Time (London, 1834)
The Minister's Family (Edinburgh, 1838)
Thoughts on the Connection between Church and State (Edinburgh, 1840)
History of the Church of Scotland (Edinburgh, 1841, and various editions)
The History of the Westminster Assembly (1843)
The History of Rome (1849)
The Harmony existing between Christianity and True Science
The Anti-Christian System
National Education in Scotland
Poems on Various Subjects (Edinburgh, 1851)
Toleration, or the Principles of Religious Liberty (Edinburgh, 1854)
Account of the Parish (New Statistical Account, ii.), 
Lecture V. (on the Social Condition of the People), and XL (to Young Men, ii.)
Authoritative Exposition of the Principles of the Free Church
edited Practical Works of the Rev. John Willison
edited Works of George Gillespie
founder and editor of Free Church Magazine.

Before completing his studies for the church he published, in 1829, Twelve Dramatic Sketches' founded on the Pastoral Poetry of Scotland, with delineations of scenery and manners.

Besides his poems Hetherington published:

The Fulness of Time 1834
The Ministers Family, 1838, a popular evangelical work.
History of the Church of Scotlandoriginally 1841 but drastically revised following the Disruption of 1843. The book was preceded by an essay On the Principles and Constitution of the Church of Scotland, and reached a seventh edition in 1852.
History of the Westminster Assembly of Divines, 1843. It was edited and annotated in 1878 by Rev. Robert Williamson.

In 1844 Hetherington established the Free Church Magazine, which he edited for four years. He also contributed to religious periodicals, especially the British and Foreign Evangelical Review, and published sermons, poems, and some shorter religious works.

References

Citations

Sources



Other sources
Attribution:
 Endnotes:
Glasgow and Edinburgh newspapers, May 1865

External links
 
 

1803 births
1865 deaths
19th-century Ministers of the Free Church of Scotland
Scottish poets
19th-century Scottish historians
Historians of Puritanism
Alumni of the University of Edinburgh
19th-century poets